Agata Kryger (born 29 November 1997) is a Polish former competitive figure skater. She is the 2013 Warsaw Cup champion and a three-time Polish national champion (2013–15).

Career
Kryger debuted on the ISU Junior Grand Prix series in 2011. In the 2012–13 season, she won her first senior national title. She was sent to Milan, Italy to compete at her first World Junior Championships but was eliminated after placing 36th in the short program.

In the 2013–14 season, Kryger returned to the JGP series, placing 16th in Košice, Slovakia and 11th in Gdańsk, Poland. In November 2013, making her senior international debut, she won the Warsaw Cup ahead of Camilla Gjersem and Elizaveta Ukolova. After winning her second national title, Kryger was assigned to her first European Championships. Ranked 23rd in the short program, she advanced to the free skate and finished 21st overall at the event in Budapest, Hungary. She did not reach the free skate at the 2014 World Junior Championships in Sofia, Bulgaria, having placed 33rd in the short program. Dorota and Mariusz Siudek coached Kryger in Toruń until the end of the 2013–14 season.

In 2014, Kryger began training in Calgary, Alberta, Canada under the guidance of Scott Davis and Jeff Langdon.

Programs

Competitive highlights 
CS: Challenger Series; JGP: Junior Grand Prix

References

External links 
 

Polish female single skaters
1997 births
Living people
Sportspeople from Toruń